The Wishing-Table is a 1956 West German family film directed by Fritz Genschow and starring Werner Stock, Wolfgang Draeger and Harald Dietl. It is based on the story of the same name by the Brothers Grimm.

Cast

References

Bibliography 
 Jill Nelmes & Jule Selbo. Women Screenwriters: An International Guide. Palgrave Macmillan, 2015.

External links 
 

1956 films
West German films
1950s German-language films
Films directed by Fritz Genschow
Films based on Grimms' Fairy Tales
German children's films
Films based on fairy tales
1950s German films